Fort Hood is a United States Army post located near Killeen, Texas. The post is the headquarters of III Armored Corps and First Army Division West and is home to the 1st Cavalry Division and 3rd Cavalry Regiment, among others. It is one of the U.S. Army installations named for Confederate soldiers to be renamed by the Commission on the Naming of Items of the Department of Defense that Commemorate the Confederate States of America or Any Person Who Served Voluntarily with the Confederate States of America. On 24 May 2022 the commission recommended the fort be renamed to Fort Cavazos, named after Gen. Richard E. Cavazos, a native Texan and the US Army’s first Hispanic four-star general. The recommendation report was finalized and submitted to Congress on 1 October 2022, giving the US Secretary of Defense Lloyd Austin the authority to rename the post to Fort Cavazos. On 5 January 2023 William A. LaPlante, US under-secretary of defense for acquisition and sustainment (USD (A&S)) directed the full implementation of the recommendations of the Naming Commission, DoD-wide.

Its origin was the need for wide-open space to test and train with World War II tank destroyers. The War Department announced the location in January 1942, and the initial completion was set for that August. The main cantonment of Fort Hood had a total population of 53,416 as of the 2010 U.S. Census. Fort Hood is the most populous U.S. military installation in the world. The main business area is in Bell County, with the training countryside area of the post in Coryell County. In April 2014, the Fort Hood website lists 45,414 assigned soldiers and 8,900 civilian employees with Fort Hood covering .

History

Foundation
During World War II, tank destroyers were developed to counter German mobile armored units. These were mobile anti-tank guns on armored halftracks or specially developed tanks. Wide-open space was needed for the tank destroyer testing and training, which Texas had in abundance. Andrew Davis (A.D.) Bruce was assigned to organize a new Tank Destroyer Tactical and Firing Center, and he chose Killeen, Texas for the new camp. The War Department announced the selection on 15 January 1942. The date of completion was set for 15 August 1942.

About 300 families had to move from their homes to make room for the camp area and the communities of Clear Creek, Elijah, and Antelope were demolished to facilitate construction of the base. The old Sugar Loaf community, historically called the "Cradle of Killeen," provided the city with many of its first citizens in 1882. All that remains of the community is the mountain from which it took its name, located in the Fort Hood area. To lessen the burden of moving, the Army agreed to allow land to be used for grazing for a nominal grazing fee. This grazing arrangement still continues today.

In mid-August, the camp was occupied and the official opening took place on 18 September 1942. Camp Hood was named in February for the Confederate General John Bell Hood, who commanded Hood's Texas Brigade during the American Civil War, part of a series of new training camps named for distinguished military leaders together with Camps Carson, Campbell and Atterbury. 

The original facilities provided housing and training sites for nearly 38,000 troops. The site near Gatesville was known as the sub-camp and later as North Camp Hood. During the war years, North Camp Hood housed nearly 40,000 troops and 4,000 prisoners of war, and was the site for the southern branch of the United States Disciplinary Barracks.

At the end of 1942, there were about 45,000 troops living and training at Camp Hood and in late June 1943 it peaked at almost 95,000 troops, which was maintained until early 1944.

In 1944, the number of tank destroyer battalions in training at Camp Hood declined rapidly. Field artillery battalions and the Infantry Replacement Training Center replaced them in March 1944. By September, the Infantry Center was the largest activity on post with 31,545 troops. The total camp population on the last day of 1944 was 50,228.

During the last year of World War II Camp Hood's mission shifted and its population drastically decreased. As the war came to an end, troop training slowed and equipment reclamation and demobilization were prioritized. A separation center was established in September 1945, and as the year ended, post strength had fallen to 1,807 prisoners and about 11,000 troops. The Infantry Replacement Training Center was officially shut down on 7 January 1946.

Cold War
The 2nd and 20th Armored Divisions were sent to Camp Hood after returning from Europe in January 1946, but the 20th was soon inactivated, leaving less than 5,000 at the post. The 2nd Armored would remain at the post until its inactivation at the end of the Cold War. Camp Hood was retained postwar as an armored training center and on 15 April 1950 was officially renamed Fort Hood as a result of its permanent status. 

In mid-1954, III Corps moved from California to Fort Hood. The Corps supervised the training of combat units at Fort Hood and other Fourth Army stations from 1954 to 1959 when III Corps was inactivated. Probably the most famous trainee to come through Fort Hood was Elvis Presley, arriving on 28 March 1958. Other than receiving record amounts of mail (3–4 bags per day), he was treated like all other trainees. On 19 September, Presley shipped out for Germany.
During this period, the 4th Armored Division was reactivated and deployed to Germany as part of the "Gyroscope" concept of unit movement.

In September 1961, Fort Hood again became the home for the III Corps, and in February 1962, III Corps was assigned as part of the U.S. Army Strategic Army Corps (STRAC). At the same time, the basing of the 1st Armored Division there made it a two-division post. On 15 June 1963 Killeen Base was turned over to the Army.

Vietnam War 
During the late 1960s, Fort Hood trained and deployed a number of units and individuals for duty in Vietnam. As the United States ended its role in the conflict, thousands of returning soldiers completed their active duty with one of the divisions. During this time, the post was modernized. On 13 September 1965, Darnall Hospital opened. In 1970, construction began on Palmer Theater and Venable Village was dedicated. Modern barracks were springing up around post. The wood buildings of Fort Hood were replaced with brick structures.

In April 1968, more than 40 African American GIs, who objected to being sent to occupy riot-damaged Black neighborhoods in Chicago following the assassination of Martin Luther King Jr., were court martialed and jailed by the US Army. Many of the soldiers were decorated and wounded veterans who had completed tours of duty in Vietnam.

In October 1969, Killeen Base was designated as West Fort Hood and the airfield's name was designated as Robert Gray Army Airfield. The base was named after a Killeen native who was a pilot of a B-25 bomber on the famous Doolittle Raid in Tokyo in 1942. He was killed later in World War II flying combat missions. With the redesignation came a change in mission at West Fort Hood. Nuclear weapons were removed; they had been secretly kept there since 1947.

In 1971, the colors of the 1st Cavalry Division came to Fort Hood from Vietnam, resulting in the reflagging of the 1st Armored Division, the colors of which were sent to Germany to reflag the 4th Armored Division.

From 23 December 1972, to 19 January 1973, elements of the 13th Support Brigade deployed to the 1972 Nicaragua earthquake to assist in disaster relief serving at Camp Christine, Managua, Nicaragua.

Proving grounds
Since the early 1970s, Fort Hood has played a major role in the training, testing, and introduction of new equipment, tactics, and organizations. The U.S. Army Training and Doctrine Command's Test and Experimentation Command (now the U.S. Army Operational Test Command), located at West Fort Hood has been a primary player. Fort Hood fielded the M1 Abrams tank, M2/3 Bradley Infantry/Cavalry Fighting Vehicle, the Multiple Launch rocket System (MLRS), and the AH-64 Apache helicopter.

In January 1975, the 1st Cavalry Division was reorganized, as the Army's newest armored division. Since fielding the M-1 Abrams in 1980, force modernization has continued as a major focus. The 1st Cavalry became the first division to field the AH-64 Apache attack helicopter, M2 Bradley Fighting Vehicle, the Humvee, the Multiple Launch Rocket System and Mobile Subscriber Equipment (MSE) tactical communications.

1990–2000 Army deployments
In August 1990, Fort Hood was alerted for deployments to Southwest Asia as part of the joint forces participating in Operation Desert Shield. The deployment to Saudi Arabia began in September, extending into mid-October.

On 21 May 1991, with the reactivation of its 3rd Brigade ("Greywolf") the 1st Cavalry Division became the largest division in the Army upon its return to the United States. In October 1992, the Engineer Brigade, 1st Cavalry Division was reactivated. Through the Engineer Restructuring Initiative, the nucleus of the brigade was formed around the 8th Engineer Battalion. The 20th Engineer Battalion was brought from Fort Campbell, KY, to join the brigade, and the 91st Engineer Battalion was activated to complete the brigade.

In November 1992, the unit designations for the battalions remaining from the former "Tiger" Brigade of the 2nd Armored Division were returned prior to the activation of the division at Fort Hood on 2 December 1992. This action was done to realign the historical designations of units to their parent divisions. On 29 November 1992, the 3rd Battalion, 41st Infantry was designated as the 1st Battalion, 9th Cavalry; 1st Battalion, 67th Armor to 3rd Battalion, 8th Cavalry, and 1st Battalion, 3rd Field Artillery to 2nd Battalion, 82nd Field Artillery. On 16 December 1992, 1st Cavalry Division units designated to accomplish realignments for historical purposes and included the 1st Battalion, 32nd Armor reflagged as 2nd Battalion, 12th Cavalry; 3rd Battalion, 32nd Armor to 1st Battalion, 12th Cavalry; and Battery A, 333rd Field Artillery to Battery B, 26th Field Artillery.

During the post war periods called Operation Desert Calm and Operation Provide Comfort, Fort Hood units continued to serve in the Persian Gulf area. From December 1992 to May 1993, Fort Hood soldiers deployed to Somalia for Operation Restore Hope to command and control the Joint Task Force Support Command. In the fall of 1994, Fort Hood units participated in the largest deployment since Operation Desert Shield and Desert Storm executed split base operations in the Caribbean Basin, Central America and Southwest Asia, in support of Operations Vigilant Warrior and Sea Signal V, as well as other contingency operations.

13th Corps Support Command Commander Brig. Gen. Billy K. Solomon deployed along with a portion of the headquarters in December 1992 to Mogadishu to serve as the nucleus of Joint Task Force Support Command. Their major units included the 593rd Support Group (Fort Lewis), 36th Engineer Group (Fort Benning), 7th Transportation Group (Fort Eustis), and 62d Medical Group (Fort Lewis). The command headquarters returned to Fort Hood in May 1993.

As a result of the Base Realignment and Closure Commission (BRAC) reductions, the 5th Infantry Division (Mechanized), then located at Fort Polk Louisiana, was reflagged as the 2nd Armored Division in late 1992. By mid-1993, the division at Fort Hood had completed changes of unit names to those associated with the 5th Division, and began participation in the early stages of the Army's Experimental Force, Force XXI.

In 1995, the 2nd Armored Division was reflagged as the U.S. 4th Infantry Division. Twenty-five years after making its home in Colorado, the 4th Infantry Division was again restationed to meet the Army's requirements but this move would be quite different from others. It became a split-based organization with six brigades and three separate battalions stationed at Fort Hood and the 3rd Brigade Combat Team remaining at Fort Carson. By December 1995, the 4th Infantry Division (Mechanized) assumed responsibility as the Army's Experimental Force (Force XXI), and on 15 December 1995, its colors were unfurled for the first time over central Texas and Fort Hood.

Since the 1990s, Fort Hood units have supported Operation Joint Endeavor in Bosnia and Herzegovina. In October 1998, The 1st Cavalry Division was the first United States division to assume authority of the Multinational Division (North) area of operation in Bosnia-Herzegovina. The mission was to conduct operations to enforce the military provisions set forth by the Dayton Peace Accords.

In 1998, the Ironhorse Division was designated to be the Army's first Multi-Component unit. The main objective being to enhance Total Force integration, optimize the unique capabilities of each component, and improve the overall readiness of the Army. The program was developed to leverage the strengths of the Army's three components (active, reserve and National Guard). As such, 515 positions within the division have been designated as reserve component. These positions include individuals, a unit from the Wyoming National Guard and dual-mission units from the Texas Army National Guard.

In addition to peacekeeping efforts, Fort Hood units routinely participate in national and international disaster relief efforts. Hours after the 1985 Mexico City earthquake, III Corps units were ready to move out to provide assistance. Fort Hood units also aided Managua, Nicaragua, after an earthquake ravaged the city.

During the 1990s, Fort Hood continued an extensive building program to modernize the post. This modernization continues today, with emphasis on quality of life, force projection and training. The Robertson Blood Center, Soldier Development Center, and a new commissary at Warrior Way have been completed. Many other improvements were made to improve the Power Projection Mission of the post such as improvements to the railhead and the runway at Gray Army Airfield. Training ranges have been upgraded.

2000–2009 Army deployments
At the beginning of the 21st century, the Army's modernization was in full swing. Some of these new advances in technology and war fighting included the fielding of the M1A2 Abrams Main Battle Tank, the M2A2 Operation Desert Storm (ODS) Bradley Infantry Fighting Vehicle, the M109A6 Paladin howitzer, the OH-58D Kiowa Warrior, the AH-64D Apache Longbow Helicopter, and the M6 Bradley Linebacker.

Fort Hood was the first installation selected to privatize post housing under the residential communities initiative. Under this initiative, new housing units, remodeled housing and community improvements will be added to the post.

In 2001, the War on Terror became a prime focus. Fort Hood transitioned from an open to a closed post with the help of military police from reserve units. The 1st Cavalry sent additional troops to Kuwait to protect against possible aggressive actions from Iraq. The 4003rd Garrison Support Reserve unit fills vacancies left by deploying units at Fort Hood. Fort Hood has a key role as a training base for mobilizing Reserve and National Guard units to support the Homeland Defense effort.

Many Fort Hood units have deployed to Afghanistan for Operation Enduring Freedom, and to Iraq for Operation Iraqi Freedom. In December 2003, the 4th Infantry Division captured Saddam Hussein. In the spring of 2004, the 1st Cavalry Division followed the 4th Infantry Division deploying to Iraq. Task Force ODIN was created at Ft. Hood.

In September 2005, 13th COSCOM and key enablers were called to support Joint Task Force Katrina/Rita hurricane relief and went on to serve as the senior joint logistical support command for JTF Katrina. 13th COSCOM eventually provided one hundred million rations, collected human remains with dignity, executed emergency engineering operations, transported, distributed and stored over one billion dollars in humanitarian relief from both non-governmental and federal sources from across the nation.

In 2009, Fort Carson, Colorado's First Army Division West re-stationed to Fort Hood in order to consolidate its mission to conduct reserve component mobilization training and validation for deployment, switching places with 4th Infantry Division, which relocated to Fort Carson.

2007 navigation exercise incident
On 12 June 2007, the body of Lawrence George Sprader, Jr was found at about 8:30 p.m. in a brushy area located within the Central Texas Army post's training ground. He had gone missing for days while conducting an exercise for testing basic map-reading and navigation skills. A massive search had been conducted, with over 3,000 parties scouring the countryside. According to autopsy records, he had died from hyperthermia and dehydration. According to an Army investigatory report, there were "a multitude of procedural violations, judgment errors and alleged acts of misconduct by Army trainers that not only contributed to Sprader's death but put some 300 other soldiers in danger that day, including about two dozen who required medical attention."

2009 shooting

On 5 November 2009 a gunman, who regarded himself as a mujahid waging "jihad" against the United States, opened fire in the Soldier Readiness Center of Fort Hood and killed 13 people while wounding 32 others. Nidal Malik Hasan, a U.S. Army Major and psychiatrist, was the gunman. He was shot and then arrested by Department of the Army police officers Sergeant Mark Todd and Sergeant Kimberly Munley.

Eyewitnesses to the actual events said: "...Major Hasan wheeled on Sergeant Munley as she rounded the corner of a building and shot her, putting her on the ground. Then Major Hasan turned his back on her and started putting another magazine into his semiautomatic pistol. It was at that moment that Senior Sgt. Mark Todd, a veteran police officer, rounded another corner of the building, found Major Hasan fumbling with his weapon and shot him."

In 2013, Hasan was convicted of thirteen counts of premeditated murder and thirty-two counts of attempted premeditated murder for the thirty soldiers and two civilian police officers injured in the shooting. On 23 August 2013, Hasan was found guilty on all charges and was sentenced to death.

A memorial site in Killeen, featuring 13 granite columns inscribed with the names and likenesses of the victims, was dedicated in March, 2016. The memorial was financed by donations and built by volunteers.

2011 attack plot
Pfc. Naser Jason Abdo, an AWOL private, was arrested near Fort Hood, and in a statement by the police chief of Killeen, Texas, the man told investigators that he wanted to attack fellow soldiers at the military post. At his trial in August 2012, Abdo stated, through a cloth mask, "I will continue until the day the dead are called to account for their deeds." Abdo was sentenced to life in prison for the plot.

2014 shootings

On 2 April 2014, a shooting spree occurred at several locations on the base, leaving three people dead and fourteen others wounded. The gunman then died from a self-inflicted gunshot wound. He was later identified as 34-year-old Ivan Lopez, an Iraq War veteran.

2014–present
A sexual assault prevention officer on the base, Sergeant 1st Class Gregory McQueen, was dishonorably discharged in March 2015, having been convicted of organizing a prostitution ring.

Currently, Fort Hood has nearly 65,000 soldiers and family members and serves as a home for the following units: Headquarters III Corps; First Army Division West; the 1st Cavalry Division; 13th Sustainment Command (formerly 13th Corps Support Command); 89th Military Police Brigade; 504th Battlefield Surveillance Brigade; 85th Civil Affairs Brigade; 1st Medical Brigade; and the 69th Air Defense Artillery Brigade. Fort Hood also includes Carl R. Darnall Army Medical Center and the Medical And Dental Activities as tenant units.

, Killeen, Texas, started a land-use study to "identify and mitigate compatibility and encroachment issues that may impact training, operations".
Command climate and culture
In 2020, a debate around renaming US military bases named after Confederate generals emerged during protests sparked from the murder of George Floyd. Fort Hood is one such base at the center of the controversy.

39 soldiers died or went missing in 2020. The killing of Vanessa Guillén at Fort Hood in April 2020 brought national attention to the base and the broader culture of sexual harassment in the military. Hundreds of people protested at the gates of Fort Hood in June demanding justice for Guillén. In August, a San Antonio man was arrested and charged with making terroristic threats after threatening to commit a mass shooting at Fort Hood in retaliation for Guillén's killing. 14 commanders were subsequently fired or suspended with Army Secretary Ryan McCarthy citing "leadership failures". An investigation by Fort Hood Independent Review Committee (FHIRC), a panel McCarthy established, found that there was a "permissive environment for sexual assault and sexual harassment at Fort Hood." Army regulation AR-600-20 (24 July 2020) now requires the filing of commander's critical information reports (CCIRs) 8 days after a SHARP (sexual harassment/assault response & prevention) complaint by a victim. 
Fort Hood CID investigators assigned to their cases are hampered by a checklist mentality from their beginnings as junior investigators straight out of initial training from Fort Leonard Wood, according to the FHIRC report. The majority of CID investigators are then detailed to protective services for senior Pentagon officials, thereby moving straight to middle management CID positions without the requisite experience in criminal investigation. After Carlton L Chee was the 28th death of 2020 in September, Congress launched an investigation of Fort Hood citing the deaths and other felonies that occurred on the fort between 2014-2019. Commanders at the FORSCOM, III Corps, and Fort Hood levels now have specific actions to complete upon a Sexual assault review board complaint. CID is being restructured: a civilian director reporting directly to the secretary of the Army will oversee criminal probes. The Provost Marshal and the Military Police will no longer undertake criminal investigations. A new branch like those in the Air Force and Navy for Special Agents will be instituted. FORSCOM now requires the selection of investigating officers from outside an installation's brigade-sized element, which is processing a complaint.

More than 100 night vision goggles (NVGs) from an arms room were stolen during March til May 2021; several dozen were offered for sale on the Internet, from a reseller in Corpus Christi, Texas as of 9 July 2021; some devices had already been sold and shipped. CID and Homeland security believe the NVGs were stolen from shipping containers at Fort Hood.

Anti-war activity
Fort Hood has served as a hub for anti-war activity during both the Vietnam War (e.g. the "Fort Hood Three" incident) and the War on Terror.

From 1968 to 1973, the Oleo Strut was a G.I. coffeehouse located near post in Killeen, Texas. The coffee house was featured in the documentary Sir! No Sir!.

In 2009, the tradition of the Oleo Strut continued when the Under the Hood Café opened. The location serves as an outreach center for antiwar activists to reach out to area soldiers, and provide them with support. Under the Hood Café announced on 10 November 2014 that it would close by the end of the year.

Recently several soldiers supported by Under the Hood have taken public acts of resistance, including Amnesty International prisoner of conscience Travis Bishop.

Demographics

As of the 2020 United States Census, there were 28,295 people, 2,893 households, and 2,720 families residing in the Fort Hood CDP.

As of the census of 2000, there were 33,711 people, 5,819 households, and 5,679 families residing in the Fort Hood CDP. The population density was 2,255.7 people per square mile (870.6/km2). There were 5,941 housing units at an average density of 397.5 per square mile (153.4/km2). The racial makeup of the CDP was 50.7% White, 31.6% African American, 1.2% Native American, 2.1% Asian, 0.8% Pacific Islander, 8.7% from other races, and 4.8% from two or more races. 16.7% of the population were Hispanics or Latinos of any race.

There were 5,818 households, out of which 87.6% had children under the age of eighteen living with them, 87.1% were married couples living together, 8.2% had a female householder with no husband present, and 2.4% were non-families. Two percent of all households were made up of individuals, and 0.0% had someone living alone who is sixty-five years of age or older. The average household size was 3.92 and the average family size was 3.95.

The age distribution was 33.3% under the age of eighteen, 32.3% from eighteen to twenty-four, 33.1% from twenty-five to forty-four, 1.2% from forty-five to sixty-four, and 0.1% who were sixty-five years of age or older. The median age was twenty-one years. For every one hundred females there were 163.4 males. For every one hundred females over the age of eighteen there were 209.4 males. All of these statistics are typical for military bases.

The median income for a household on the base was $32,552, and the median income for a family was $32,296. Males had a median income of $18,884 versus $17,101 for females. The per capita income for the CDP was $11,078. 9.5% of the population and 8.3% of families were below the poverty line. Out of the total population, 11.0% of those under the age of eighteen and 25.8% of those sixty-five and older were living below the poverty line.

Military base

Fort Hood is a large United States military installation; it is the home of III Armored Corps, 1st Cavalry Division, 13th Sustainment Command, First Army Division West, 3rd Cavalry Regiment, 1st Medical Brigade and many other Forces Command and other units.

The 4th Infantry Division completed its move from Fort Hood to Fort Carson, Colorado, exchanging positions with several units. The 4th Infantry Division Museum closed at Fort Hood for the last time on 29 May 2009 to complete its move to Colorado although most of the outdoor pieces remained at Fort Hood as part of the new 3CR Museum.

Before the breakup of the Soviet Union, Fort Hood was billed as the largest military base in the free world (Fort Benning is larger in personnel, Fort Bliss in land area). During peacetime, Fort Hood is a gated post, with the 1st Cavalry Division Museum, the Belton Lake Outdoor Recreation Area (BLORA), and a number of other facilities that are open to the public. Access to the cantonments became restricted starting in July 2001. However, passes are available to visit the two museums on post, and the lake area remains open to the public without restriction since it is outside the cantonments. Various events, including the annual Independence Day celebration, which has one of the largest fireworks displays in the country, are open to the public.

Shortly after the 2000 census, responsibility for post housing was turned over to privatized partnership with Actus Lend Lease. Under the terms of the contract, most of the housing has been remodeled or rebuilt, and hundreds of new units have been built or are in the process of being built, operating as Fort Hood Family Housing. The nine schools on Fort Hood are part of the Killeen Independent School District.

Fort Hood consists of three sections: the main cantonment, West Fort Hood, and North Fort Hood. The main cantonment is bounded by Killeen on the east and Copperas Cove on the west. The Fort Hood main cantonment area, otherwise referred to as Main post, holds its own airfield, Hood Army Airfield. North Fort Hood is bounded by Gatesville to the northwest. West Fort Hood, bounded by Killeen and Copperas Cove, includes Fort Hood's second airfield, Robert Gray Army Airfield, which has been expanded for civilian use (Killeen–Fort Hood Regional Airport (GRK)) and additional training areas. To the east and southeast, the reservation is bounded by Harker Heights, Nolanville, Belton, and Morgan's Point Resort.

Notable residents
Mark Adickes – football player, surgeon, commentator (Originally from Bad Cannstatt, Stuttgart, Germany)
Donald Buckram – football player
Robert Griffin III – football player (Originally from Okinawa, Japan)
Ciara - R&B singer
Bobby Luna – football player (Originally from Lewisburg, Tennessee)
Josh Lovelady – football player
Tamera Mowry – actress (Originally from Gelnhausen, Hesse, Germany)
Tia Mowry – actress (Originally from Gelnhausen, Hesse, Germany)
Donald Prell – futurologist and author (Originally from Los Angeles, California)
Elvis Presley – singer, actor (Originally from Tupelo, Mississippi)
Geoff Ramsey – film producer, actor (Originally from Mobile, Alabama)
Lucas Till – actor
Anna Todd – author (Originally from Dayton, Ohio)
Yoon Mi-rae – American-born South Korean singer
Vanessa Guillen, U.S. Army specialist and murder victim (Originally from Houston, Texas)
Sgt Devin James Gill. Starved his child, He served in 2-7 Cav 1st Armored Brigade Combat Team, B-Co 3rd Platoon.

See also

List of World War II prisoner-of-war camps in the United States

References

Citations

Bibliography 
Cragg, Dan, Sgt. Maj. (USA Ret.), The guide to military installations, Stackpole Books, Harrisburg, 1983

Notes

External links

Hood official site

Census-designated places in Bell County, Texas
Census-designated places in Coryell County, Texas
Census-designated places in Texas
Hood
Hood
Killeen–Temple–Fort Hood metropolitan area
1942 establishments in Texas
Military installations established in 1942